Piedmont is an unincorporated community in western Moorefield Township, Harrison County, Ohio, United States.  It has a post office with the ZIP code 43983.

Piedmont was originally called Butler, and under the latter name was laid out in 1800.

References

Unincorporated communities in Ohio
Unincorporated communities in Harrison County, Ohio